Rohan Saifoloi (born 20 November 1991) is an Australian rugby union player, currently playing for the Old Glory DC of Major League Rugby (MLR). His preferred position is fly-half.

Professional career
Saifoloi signed for Major League Rugby side Old Glory DC for the 2022 Major League Rugby season.

References

External links
itsrugby.co.uk Profile

1991 births
Living people
Rugby union fly-halves
Australian rugby union players
Tasman rugby union players
Greater Sydney Rams players
Sydney (NRC team) players
New South Wales Country Eagles players
Queensland Country (NRC team) players
Old Glory DC players